Yi Chu-huan (born 31 August 1987) is a Taiwanese professional tennis player who plays primarily on the ATP Challenger Tour and ITF Futures Tour. On 11 January 2010, he reached his highest ATP singles ranking at world No. 489. He reached his highest doubles ranking of world No. 109 on 20 February 2017.

Juniors

As a junior, Yi reached his highest combined singles/doubles ranking of world No. 4 on April 25, 2005.

Yi won the 2005 Australian Open junior boys' doubles title. Partnering Kim Sun-Yong of Korea, they defeated Thiemo de Bakker and Donald Young 6–3, 6–4 in the final to win the championship.

Career

Yi has reached 6 career singles finals, posting a record of 2 wins and 6 losses. Additionally, he has reached a bountiful 63 career doubles finals, holding s record of 35 wins and 28 losses.

He represents his native country of Chinese Taipei during Davis Cup play, and holds a record of 0–2 in singles matches and 4–7 in doubles matches for a combined total of a 4-9 record.

ATP Challenger and ITF Futures finals

Singles: 6 (2–4)

Doubles: 63 (35–28)

Junior Grand Slam finals

Doubles: 1 (1 title)

References

External links

 

1987 births
Living people
Taiwanese male tennis players
Asian Games medalists in tennis
Tennis players at the 2010 Asian Games
Tennis players at the 2006 Asian Games
Asian Games gold medalists for Chinese Taipei
Asian Games bronze medalists for Chinese Taipei
Medalists at the 2006 Asian Games
Medalists at the 2010 Asian Games
Universiade medalists in tennis
Universiade gold medalists for Chinese Taipei
Universiade bronze medalists for Chinese Taipei
Grand Slam (tennis) champions in boys' doubles
Australian Open (tennis) junior champions
Medalists at the 2009 Summer Universiade
21st-century Taiwanese people